BNS Ali Haider is a Type 053H2 guided-missile frigate of Bangladesh Navy. The warship is serving in Bangladesh Navy since 2014. It is named after the fourth Rashidun Caliph Ali.

Armament
The ship is armed with two quad-pack C-802A anti-ship missile launchers. It also carries two Type 79A dual-100 mm gun to engage surface targets. For air defence role, the ship carries four Type 76 dual-37 mm AA guns. For anti-submarine operations, the ship has two five tube RBU-1200 anti-submarine rocket launchers. she also carries two depth charge (DC) racks and four DC projectors. There are two Mark 36 SRBOC 6-barrel decoy rocket launchers in the ship too.

Career
The Type 053H2 frigate BNS Ali Haider was previously known as Wuhu which served with People's Liberation Army Navy (PLAN) in East Sea Fleet. It was commissioned in PLAN in 1987. In 2013 the ship was sold to Bangladesh Navy. She was commissioned on 1 March 2014 as BNS Ali Haider (F-17).

BNS Ali Haider left for Lebanon to participate in the UN mission United Nations Interim Force in Lebanon (UNIFIL) on 12 May 2014. She replaced the ship  there from 14 June 2014.

After completion of the UNIFIL deployment period, the ship visited the Port of Colombo in Sri Lanka from 7 February to 9 February 2018 on her way back home.

Ali Haider took part in Coordinated Patrol (CORPAT-2019) exercise with the Indian Navy along the Bangladesh-India maritime border from 10 to 12 October 2019. The ship reached Visakhapatnam Port of India as a part of exercise on 12 October 2019. She came back home on 18 October 2019.

See also
 List of active ships of the Bangladesh Navy

References

Ships of the Bangladesh Navy
Frigates of the Bangladesh Navy
Type 053H2 frigates of the Bangladesh Navy
Ships built in China
1986 ships